Clavulina delicia is a species of fungus in the family Clavulinaceae. Originally named Clavaria delicia by Miles Joseph Berkeley in 1856, it was transferred to Clavulina in 1950 by British botanist E.J.H. Corner. It occurs in South America.

References

External links

Fungi described in 1856
Fungi of South America
delicia
Taxa named by Miles Joseph Berkeley